Sweet as Sin is a 2012 book about candy.

Sweet as Sin may also refer to:
"Sweet as Sin", a song from the English version of the Fey album Dulce Tentación
"Sweet as Sin", a song by INXS released with the singles "This Time" and "What You Need"
"Sweet as Sin", a song by The Lust-O-Rama

See also
As Sweet as Sin, 2006 album by the Bleeders
The Sweets of Sin, Australian pop band